Dr. André Robert (April 28, 1929 – November 18, 1993) was a Canadian meteorologist who pioneered the modelling the Earth's atmospheric circulation.

Biography and career 
Born in New York, NY in 1928, Robert moved to Grand-Mère, Quebec in May 1937. He received his BSc from Laval University in 1952 and his MSc from the University of Toronto in 1953. He began employment with the Meteorological Service of Canada as a weather forecaster, then in 1959 shifted his interest  to research in atmospheric models for short and medium-range numerical weather prediction.

For his PhD (awarded in 1965), Robert worked at McGill University on the spectral model using spectral harmonics for the representation of atmospheric fields in global climate and numerical weather prediction models.

Between 1963 and 1970, Robert developed the semi-implicit time integration algorithm for an efficient integration of the primitive equations for numerical weather prediction and climate models. Several weather centres in the world adopted this algorithm for their models (Canada in 1974, Australia in 1976, ECMWF in 1977, USA in 1980).

In 1980, Robert successfully combined his semi-implicit scheme with existing Lagrangian techniques which allows the use of much longer time steps and hence produces a very efficient integration of meteorological equations.

Robert retired from the Canadian Meteorological Centre in Montreal in 1987 and took a Faculty position at the Université du Québec à Montréal. There he worked with colleagues to develop a fully elastic atmospheric model that relaxed the hydrostatic approximation used by all large-scale climate and numerical weather prediction models, thus paving the way to a universal model formulation usable at all scales. The resulting model came to be known by the name of Mesoscale Compressible Community model (MC).

Robert's career was devoted to developing and implementing numerical techniques to solve the interacting time-dependent partial differential equations governing the chronological development of atmospheric behavior in an efficient manner, while still retaining accuracy; in contrast to many scientists who were concerned only with precision.

International influence 

During his career, André Robert held several positions in national and international organizations: 
 In 1968-69, he was a visiting professor at the American meteorologists training center in Washington, D.C.
 From 1968 to 1972, he was a member of the meteorology and atmospheric sciences subcommittee on the National Research Council of Canada. 
 From 1970 to 1976, Dr. Robert was a member of the working group on numerical weather prediction of the World Meteorological Organization (WMO) and became its president in 1973.
 From 1972 to 1976 he was editor of publications of the WMO in numerical weather prediction.
 In 1972-1973, he was President of the Canadian Meteorological and Oceanographic Society. At the same time, he was president of the group for the organization of a WMO conference on the subgrid parameterization in Leningrad (USSR), and another on modeling in Tallahassee (Florida).
 In 1974, he chaired the International Symposium on Spectral Methods in Numerical Weather Prediction in Copenhagen, Denmark. In 1975, he was a member of the Canadian delegation to the Seventh World Meteorological Organization Congress. From 1980 to 1983, he was a member of the selection committee for fellowships in meteorology, astronomy and Aeronomy of the Natural Sciences and Engineering Research Council.

Awards 

Dr. Robert received these Awards:

 1967 and 1971, President of the jury for the awards from the Canadian Meteorological and Oceanography Society.
 1968, made Fellow of the American Meteorological Society.
 1981, prize of the second half of the twentieth century bestowed by the American Meteorological Society.
 1982, made Fellow of the Royal Society of Canada.
 1986, received the Patterson Medal from the Atmospheric Environment Service (former name of the Meteorological Service of Canada).
 From 1987 to 1993, Emeritus researcher to the Atmospheric Environment Service.

References

Bibliography 
 
 
 
 

1929 births
1993 deaths
Canadian meteorologists
Fellows of the Royal Society of Canada
Academic staff of the Université du Québec à Montréal
Université Laval alumni
University of Toronto alumni
McGill University alumni
Fellows of the American Meteorological Society
French Quebecers